Moshe Zorman (Hebrew: משה זורמן; born 1952) is an Israeli composer. His works include nine operas —among them “The Inn of Spirits” after Natan Alterman’s play of the same name—as well as works for symphony orchestra, chamber groups and choirs. His works and arrangements have been performed by the Israel Philharmonic Orchestra, the Welsh BBC Orchestra, the Jerusalem Symphony Orchestra (IBA), the Israel Sinfonietta Beer-Sheva and the Baltimore Symphony, among others. He has also written music for theatre productions at the Habima and Cameri theatres in Israel and for the Inbal and Bat-Sheva dance companies.

Biography
Zorman studied composition with Prof. Leon Schidlowsky and Prof. Tzvi Avni. After graduating from the Tel Aviv Music Academy, he studied his Ph.D at New York City University Graduate Ceber CUNY with George Perle and participated in composers’ seminars in Vermont (with Mario Davidovsky) and in Canada (with John Cage). He returned to Israel in 1985 to teach at the Tel Aviv University and is a professor at the Levinsky College of Education.
|occupation=Composer, arranger, musicologist
Zorman was a member of the Israel Composers' League Board of Directors, and initiated a series of concerts dedicated to Israeli composers. He is also a member of different music committees in the Israel Ministry of Education. From 1990 to 1996 he was the head of the Music Department at the Levinsky Teachers’ College in Tel Aviv. He continues to teach at the college, and is currently head of the Music Cathedra at the Einav Cultural Center in Tel Aviv.

Awards
The Mifal Hayis Landau Prize for contemporary classical composer (2017)
Israel Prime minister's prize for composers (2002)
“the Sam Spiegel School” in Jerusalem for music for film, (2002)
ACUM Prize for original composition (1993).

External links 
Moshe Zorman biography at the Music Cathedra website

20th-century classical composers
21st-century classical composers
Israeli composers
Living people
1952 births
Male classical composers
20th-century male musicians
21st-century male musicians